Unabomber: The True Story is a 1996 American made-for-television biographical film directed by Jon Purdy and starring Tobin Bell as Ted Kaczynski, who is also known as the Unabomber.

Cast
Robert Hays as David Kaczynski
Dean Stockwell as Ben Jeffries
Tobin Bell as Ted Kaczynski
Victoria Mallory as Linda Kaczynski

Reception
Maj Canton of Radio Times gave the film two stars out of five.

References

External links
 

1996 films
1996 television films
1990s biographical films
American biographical films
Films set in the 20th century
USA Network original films
1990s English-language films
1990s American films